Michael O'Connor, S.J. (September 27, 1810 – October 18, 1872) was an Irish-born prelate of the Roman Catholic Church in the United States and a member of the Society of Jesus. He served twice as bishop of the Diocese of Pittsburgh in Pennsylvania (1843 to early 1853 and late 1853 to 1860).  O'Connor served briefly as bishop of the Diocese of Erie for several months in 1853.

Biography

Early life 
Michael O'Connor was born in Cobh, near the city of Cork, in County Cork, Ireland. His younger brother, James, would serve as the first Bishop of Omaha from 1885 to 1891. Michael O'Connor received his early education in Cobh, where he attended a school attached to the Cathedral of Cloyne. At  age 14, he was sent by William Coppinger, the Catholic Bishop of Cloyne, to begin his studies for the priesthood in France.

O'Connor continued his studies at the Urban College of the Propaganda in Rome. He completed his courses in philosophy and theology with distinction, and won a gold medal for being the first in mathematics. He finished his studies before reaching the canonical age for ordination, and spent the interval as a professor of Sacred Scriptures at the College of Propaganda. O'Connor earned a Doctor of Divinity degree following a public disputation, in which he underwent the same test made by Thomas Aquinas and Bonaventure at the University of Paris in the 13th century.

Priesthood
O'Connor was ordained a priest in Rome on June 1, 1833 by then-Archbishop Costantino Patrizi Naro. He was then appointed as vice-rector of the Pontifical Irish College in Rome. He also served as an agent of the Irish bishops with the Holy See, working with Pope Gregory XVI and Cardinal Nicholas Wiseman. In 1834, O'Connor returned to Ireland and served as a curate in Fermoy. He was also chaplain for the convent of the Presentation Sisters in Doneraile. He applied for the position of professor of dogmatic theology at Maynooth College but was persuaded by a colleague, Peter Kenrick, to pursue a teaching position in the United States.

In 1839, Patrick Kenrick's brother, Francis, a former schoolmate of O'Connor in Rome, was by then the Bishop of Philadelphia and invited him to join the faculty of St. Charles Borromeo Seminary in Philadelphia. O'Connor accepted the offer, and arrived in Philadelphia later in 1839. He immediately assumed the chair of theology at St. Charles, of which he became president soon afterwards. In addition to his academic duties, O'Connon ministered at the missions in Norristown, Pennsylvania and West Chester, Pennsylvania twice a month. He also founded St. Francis Xavier Parish in the Fairmount section of Philadelphia. In 1840, O'Connor was relieved of his duties as a professor and missionary, but continued to serve as President of St. Charles Seminary.

In June 1841, O'Connor was appointed as vicar general of Western Pennsylvania and pastor of St. Paul's Parish  in Pittsburgh. He there established a parochial school and organized a literary society for young men.

Bishop of Pittsburgh

The Fifth Provincial Council of Baltimore, held in May 1843, recommended the erection of the Diocese of Pittsburgh and nominated O'Connor as its first Bishop. When Pope Gregory XVI accepted the recommendation, O'Connor traveled to Rome for consecration as a bishop.  However, once there he petitioned the pope to revoke his appointment and to allow him instead to enter the Jesuits instead. Gregory refused and said, "You shall be bishop first, and a Jesuit afterwards". O'Connor accepted the pope's will and was formally appointed the first bishop of Pittsburgh on August 11, 1843. On August 15, he received his consecration from Cardinal Giacomo Fransoni at the Church of Sant'Agata dei Goti in Rome.

On his return to the United States, O'Connor passed through Ireland to recruit clergy for his new diocese, obtaining eight seminarians from Maynooth College and seven Sisters of Mercy from Dublin. He arrived in Pittsburgh in December 1843, where he found a diocese comprising 33 churches, 14 priests, and about 25,000 Catholics. To organize the new diocese, he held the first diocesan synod in 1844, and the same year he founded a girls' academy and orphan asylum, a chapel for African Americans, the Pittsburgh Catholic and St. Michael's Seminary. To serve the German immigrants in his diocese, he welcomed the Benedictine monks who founded Saint Vincent Archabbey in Latrobe, Pennsylvania, the first Benedictine monastery in the United States, and to further education he invited the Franciscan Brothers of Mountbellew in Ireland, who established the first community of religious brothers in the United States in Loretto.

Bishop of Erie 
On July 29, 1853, O'Connor was appointed the first Bishop of the newly erected Diocese of Erie by Pope Pius IX. The dividing line of the new diocese ran east and west along the northern boundaries of Cambria, Indiana, Armstrong, Butler, and Lawrence Counties, giving thirteen northern counties to the Diocese of Erie and fifteen to the Diocese of Pittsburgh. Father Joshua Young was named his successor in Pittsburgh, but Young's reluctance to become bishop of Pittsburgh and the petition of Pittsburgh Catholics to keep O'Connor moved the Holy See to reverse its decision.

Bishop of Pittsburgh 
Five months after his transfer to Erie, O'Connor was re-appointed as bishop of the Diocese of Pittsburgh on December 20, 1853, and Young accepted the leadership of Erie.

In 1854, O'Connor was summoned to Rome to take part in the definition of the dogma of the Immaculate Conception, and it is said that changes in the wording of the decree were due to his suggestions. His health entered into a steady decline and, on the advice of his physicians, traveled throughout Europe, Asia, and North America in search of a more hospitable climate. At the end of O'Connor's tenure, the diocese contained 77 churches, 86 priests, six religious congregations, one seminary, five institutions of higher education, two orphan asylums, one hospital, and a Catholic population of 50,000.

Resignation and later life 
O'Connor resigned as bishop of the Diocese of Pittsburgh on May 23, 1860. Pursuing his desire to join the Society of Jesus, he sailed for Europe the following October and was admitted into the Jesuit novitiate at Gorheim, (now part of Sigmaringen), in the Kingdom of Prussia, on December 22. In 1862, when he had completed the novitiate, by a special dispensation of the Jesuit Superior General, Peter Jan Beckx, O'Connor was permitted to make his solemn profession of the four religious vows unique to the Society immediately, bypassing the normal 15 years of full formation in the Society. 

O'Connor was then assigned to the Jesuit community in Boston, Massachusetts, where he made his religious profession on December 23, 1862. When Boston College was formally founded in 1864, he became a member of the faculty for the new school, where he taught theology. Additionally, he was appointed socius (counselor) to the Provincial Superior of the Jesuits in the United States, a position in which he remained until his death. He took a special interest in the spiritual welfare of African Americans, and delivered lectures in many parts of the United States and Canada.

His health failing, O'Connor was sent to rest at Woodstock College in Maryland during the spring of 1872. He died there some months later, at the age of sixty-two. He is buried in the Jesuit cemetery at Woodstock.

References

External links 
 
 Roman Catholic Diocese of Pittsburgh History of Bishops webpage

19th-century Irish Jesuits
1810 births
1872 deaths
American Roman Catholic clergy of Irish descent
Clergy from Cobh
Pontifical Urban University alumni
Academic staff of the Pontifical Urban University
Irish emigrants to the United States (before 1923)
St. Charles Borromeo Seminary faculty
St. Charles Borromeo Seminary Presidents
Roman Catholic bishops of Pittsburgh
Roman Catholic bishops of Erie
19th-century Roman Catholic bishops in the United States
19th-century American Jesuits
Jesuit bishops
Boston College faculty
Burials in Maryland